Katymár (or ; Bunjevac: Kaćmar) is a  village in Bács-Kiskun County, in the Southern Great Plain region of southern Hungary.

Geography

Notable persons
Notable persons born in Katymár:
 Mijo Mandić, Bunjevac writer (in Hungarian texts: Mándity Mihály)
 Ivan Petreš Čudomil, Croatian writer
 Prof. Dr. József Krékits, Professor emeritus, linguist

Notable persons that lived and worked in Katymár:
 Lajčo Budanović, bishop

References

Populated places in Bács-Kiskun County
Hungarian German communities